Natuashish is an Innu community in the Canadian province of Newfoundland and Labrador. The community is inhabited by the Mushuau Innu First Nation. Natuashish became a federal Indian reserve in 2003.

The population of Natuashish at the 2021 Census was 856, down from 938 in 2016.

Initial reports suggested that the Canadian government's plan of renewal and healing had been a failure, as the community was still plagued with alcohol and drug abuse. The government was accused of creating a system overburdened with bureaucracy, and not adequately addressing the issue. The local tribal band was accused of corruption, as was shown in a 2005 CBC report in which it was shown that the leadership was trafficking drugs and other illicit substances to maintain power.

The community's attempt to resolve its problem with alcoholism led to a ban on the sale, purchase, and possession of alcohol within the  reserve. The bylaw was originally passed in 2008 by a margin of two votes. The prohibition bylaw was upheld in a subsequent referendum held in the community in March 2010.

The community continues to struggle with drug abuse and youth boredom. As recently as 2017 gas sniffing by youths has been a notable issue.

Natuashish is inaccessible by road and may be reached only by air or sea. The community is served by the Natuashish Airport.

References

Innu communities in Newfoundland and Labrador
Populated places in Labrador
Road-inaccessible communities of Newfoundland and Labrador
Indian reserves in Newfoundland and Labrador
First Nations reserves in Newfoundland and Labrador